The men's triple jump event  at the 1993 IAAF World Indoor Championships was held on 12 and 13 March.

Medalists

Note: Nikolay Raev of Bulgaria had originally won the bronze but was later disqualified for doping.

Results

Qualification
Qualification: 16.70 (Q) or at least 12 best performers (q) qualified for the final.

Final

References

Triple
Triple jump at the World Athletics Indoor Championships